Cydrocrinus is an extinct genus of crinoids.

Fossil records
This genus is known in the fossil records of the Carboniferous period of United States (age range: 345.3 to 342.8 million years ago).

References 

Cladida
Prehistoric crinoid genera